Bridgeport is a mostly industrial neighborhood in Richmond, British Columbia. It holds Bridgeport station at the west side of the neighbourhood, which is a stop on the Canada Line of the Vancouver SkyTrain System. Its population is 3,897 as of 2020.

Neighbourhoods in Richmond, British Columbia